A taskmaster is a supervisor who imposes hard or burdensome work.

Taskmaster may also refer to:

 Taskmaster (TV series), a British comedy panel show
 Taskmaster (American TV series), an American version of the British show
 Taskmaster Australia, an Australian version of the British show
 , a Finnish version of the British show
 Taskmaster (New Zealand TV series), a New Zealand version of the British show
 , a Norwegian version of the British show
 , a Swedish version of the British show
 Taskmaster (character), a Marvel Comics supervillain
 "Taskmaster", song by the grindcore band Pig Destroyer from the album Painter of Dead Girls
 "Taskmaster", song by Hullabaloo from the album Beat Until Stiff
 Kevin Sullivan (wrestler) (born 1949), an American wrestler nicknamed "The Taskmaster"